Piel Pinocchio may refer to one of three different aircraft designs by Claude Piel:

 Piel CP-10 Pinocchio, a tandem-wing design
 Piel CP-20 Pinocchio, a sport monoplane
 Piel CP.90 Pinocchio II, a later sport monoplane